The Audi RSQ concept vehicle series include:

Audi RSQ (2004)

The Audi RSQ is a mid-engined concept car developed by Audi AG for use as a product placement in the 2004 sci-fi film I, Robot. It is meant to depict a technologically advanced automobile in the Chicago cityscape from the year 2035.

This sports coupé is a visionary interpretation of Audi's typical automobile design. An important challenge presented to the designers was that in order for the car to be successful advertising for Audi as product placement, despite its extreme character, the car still had to be recognised by those audience members familiar with car designs as an Audi. To accommodate this demand, the engineers implemented a current Audi front-end design which includes the trapezoidal "Audi Single-Frame Grille," the company's trademark overlapping four rings, and the Multi Media Interface (MMI) driver-to-car control system. The RSQ also includes special features suggested by film director Alex Proyas. The car uses spheres instead of conventional wheels. Its two reverse butterfly doors are hinged to the C-posts of the body.

Although this kind of collaboration was a first for Audi, a similar project named the Lexus 2054 was developed by Lexus for use in the 2002 film Minority Report.

Audi RSQ e-tron (2019)

The Audi RSQ e-tron is a concept car developed by Audi for use in the 2019 animated film Spies in Disguise.

According to Audi, the car was designed closely with Blue Sky Studios and features a "visionary design language and futuristic highlights including a hologram speedometer".

Marketing
As part of the Audi RSQ e-tron and Spies in Disguise movie launch, a video named 'Lunchbreak' was produced.

See also
Audi Le Mans quattro, a similar styled concept car
Audi R8, a road car influenced by the RSQ's design and the production version of the Le Mans Quattro.

References

External links

 Audi UK page: RSQ, RSQ e-tron

RSQ e-tron
Cars designed and produced for films
All-wheel-drive vehicles